MLI may refer to:

 .mli, OCaml module file name extension.
 The Macdonald-Laurier Institute, Canadian think tank
 The FIFA country code for Mali
 MedicoLegal Investigations Ltd, UK company
 Quad City International Airport, Moline, Illinois, US, IATA code
 Multilateral Convention to Implement Tax Treaty Related Measures to Prevent Base Erosion and Profit Shifting
 Multi-layer insulation, used on spacecraft
 Muslim Leadership Initiative
 Roman numeral for 1051